List of military engagements of World War I encompasses land, naval, and air engagements as well as campaigns, operations, defensive lines and sieges. Campaigns generally refer to broader strategic operations conducted over a large bit of territory and over a long period of time. Battles generally refer to short periods of intense combat localised to a specific area and over a specific period of time. However, use of the terms in naming such events is not consistent. For example, the First Battle of the Atlantic was more or less an entire theatre of war, and the so-called battle lasted for the duration of the entire war.

Western Front

The Western Front comprised the fractious borders between France, Germany, and the neighboring countries. It was infamous for the nature of the fight that developed there; after almost a full year of inconclusive fighting, the front had become a giant trench line stretching from one end of Europe to the other.

1914

 Battle of Liège

The Battle of Liège was the first battle of the war, and could be considered a moral victory for the allies, as the heavily outnumbered Belgians held out against the German Army for 12 days. From 5–16 August 1914, the Belgians successfully resisted the numerically superior Germans, and inflicted surprisingly heavy losses on their aggressors. The German Second Army, comprising 320,000 men, crossed into neutral Belgium in keeping to the Schlieffen Plan, with the ultimate goal of attacking France from the north. Liège was key strategically as it held a position at the head of a pass through the Ardennes, which made it the best possible route into the heart of Belgium itself.

The city was surrounded by a ring of 12 heavily armed forts, garrisoned by 70,000 men under the command of Gérard Leman. A night attack on 5 August was repulsed with heavy losses to the Germans, to the extreme surprise of the supremely confident German army. The next day, rather than confront the forts in battle, the German commander Erich Ludendorff attacked the city through the back, through a break in the line of fortresses that the Belgians had intended to fortify, but never did so. Although they succeeded in capturing the city, the Germans knew that they could not continue advancing troops into Belgium without first breaking down the forts. Aided by 17-inch Howitzers, the Germans finally succeeded in bringing down the forts on 16 August.

The unprecedented Belgian resistance seriously prolonged the opening German assault at the outbreak of World War I, allowing France and Britain time to organize themselves and a defense of Paris. In addition, it was an important moral victory for the Allies.

Battle of the Frontiers
The early French initiative, to capture territory lost to the Germans in the 1870–1871 Franco-Prussian War, which France started, was played out in a series of frontier battles between the Germans and the French, known collectively as the Battle of the Frontiers. The battles at Mulhouse, Lorraine, the Ardennes, Charleroi, and Mons were launched more or less simultaneously, and marked the collision of the German and French war plans, the Schlieffen Plan and Plan XVII, respectively.

 Battle of Mülhausen
The Battle of Mülhausen was the opening attack by the French against the Germans. The battle was part of a French attempt to conquer the province of Alsace, which had been lost as a consequence of having lost the Franco-Prussian War of 1870–1871, as it had a majority of ethnic Germans. A French force under General Louis Bonneau detached from the French First Corps and invaded the frontier on August 8, 1914. Opposing them was the German 7th Division. The capture of the area, preordained by the French Plan XVII, was to boost national pride—and to provide a guard force for the flank of subsequent invasions.

The French quickly captured the border town of Altkirch with a bayonet charge. Bonneau, suspicious of the little German resistance, was wary of a carefully planned German trap. However, under orders the next day he advanced to Mülhausen, capturing it with little effort, for the Germans had already abandoned it.

In France, the conquering of the German city Mülhausen, without a fight, was celebrated greatly. However, with the arrival of German reserves from Straßburg, the tides were turned, and the Germans mounted a counter-attack on nearby Cernay. Unable to mount an all-encompassing defense, and unable to call on reserves of his own, Bonneau began a slow withdrawal from the region. Support troops hastily sent by the French commander-in-chief Joseph Joffre arrived too late to prevent Bonneau from retiring. Joffre was immensely angry with Bonneau, charging him with a "lack of aggression" and immediately relieving him of command. Realizing the psychological magnitude of the loss, he assembled a force, led by Paul Pau, which tried unsuccessfully to recapture the province.

 Battle of Lothringen

The invasion and recapture of Lorraine formed one of the major parts of the French pre-war strategy, Plan XVII. The loss of Lorraine (and Alsace; see above) to the Prussians in the 1870-1871 Franco-Prussian War was seen as a national humiliation by the public and military alike, and was at the forefront of their minds for the next war against the Germans.

The battle was initiated by the French First and Second armies. The First, led by General Auguste Dubail, intended to take Sarrebourg, whilst the Second, led by General Noel de Castelnau, intended to take Morhange. Both towns were well fortified, and the task of defending them fell to Crown Prince Rupprecht, who had overall control of the German Sixth and Seventh armies.

Rupprecht adopted a strategy in which he would fall back under the French attacks, then counter-attack once he lured the French all the way to his fortifications. As the French army advanced, it met stern resistance in the form of German artillery and machine-gun fire. Army Chief of Staff Helmuth von Moltke authorized a more aggressive tactic soon after, and on August 20, the German army started to roll back the French. Caught by surprise and without the assistance of entrenched positions, the Second Army was pushed back quickly, eventually into France itself. A gap was exposed between the forces in Mulhouse and those in Lorraine; the forces in Mulhouse were withdrawn to keep the gap from being taken advantage of by the Germans.

Diverging from the Schlieffen Plan, Rupprecht received reinforcements and attacked the French line near the Trouée de Charmes; however, through the use of reconnaissance aircraft, the French spotted the German buildup, and were able to build an adequate defence. Thus the German gains were minimized, and were eradicated by a following French counter-assault on the 25th. Fighting continued there until the end of August, and quickly ground into a stalemate and trench warfare.

 Battle of the Ardennes
The Battle of Ardennes, fought between 21 and 23 August 1914, was another of the early frontier battles, conducted during the first month of the war. The battle was sparked by the mutual collision of French and German invasion forces in the lower Ardennes Forest.

The pre-war French strategy expected German forces in the area to be light, and the French light, rapid firing artillery was expected to convey an advantage in forested terrain over the bigger German guns. Instead, it became increasingly apparent to all of the commanders in the region that a significant enemy presence was gathering, for the Germans had planned an offensive through the area.

The sets of armies joined battle on both sides. General Pierre Ruffey's Third Army to the south and Fernand de Langle de Cary's Fourth Army to the north, fighting Germany's Fourth, led by Duke Albrecht, and Fifth army, led by Crown Prince Wilhelm.

The German troops started moving through the forest on 19 August. Conditions worsened, and by the time the two armies met, the forest was covered in a deep fog, resulting in the two forces stumbling into one another. At first, the French took the Germans as a light screening force; however, in reality the French were heavily outnumbered. The first day of the battle consisted of light skirmishes; the main battle did not begin until 21 August.

According to the pre-war French strategy document, Plan XVII, German forces in the area were only expected to be light, with French light, rapid-firing artillery proving advantageous in a wooded terrain such as that found in the Ardennes. However, what emerged was totally opposite; the French eagerly charged at German positions in the woods, and were mowed down by machine-gun fire. The French armies retreated hurriedly in the face of superior German tactical positioning, and the Germans chased them all the way back into the French border. In addition to losing a key strategic position, the French forfeited iron resources in the region as well.

 Battle of Charleroi
The Battle of Charleroi, another of the frontier battles, was an action taking place 12–23 August 1914. The battle was joined by the French Fifth Army, advancing north towards the River Sambre, and the German Second and Third armies, moving southwest through Belgium. The Fifth army was meant to join the Third and Fourth armies in their attack through the Ardennes. However, this plan was put into effect assuming the Germans were not considering an assault further north, through Belgium—which was the German plan all along. Charles Lanrezac, commander of the Fifth Army, was strongly against the idea, fearing an attack from the north. However Joseph Joffre, chief-of-staff, rejected any such idea; after much persuasion, Lanrezac finally convinced him to move the Fifth Army northwards.

However, by the time the Fifth Army arrived, units of the German Second Army were already in the area. Joffre authorized an attack across the Sambre, predicting that the German force had 18 divisions, comparable to Lanrezac's 15, plus another 3 British reinforcements (the British Expeditionary Force). However, Lanrezac predicted much higher numbers, closer to the actual number—32 German divisions. He preferred to wait for reinforcements, however that same day the Germans attacked across the river and established two beachheads, neither of which fell despite several French counterattacks.

The next day, the main attack began; the fighting carried on through the day, and into the next. The French centre suffered severe losses and retreated; but the west and east flanks both held their ground. However, the retreat of cavalry divisions to the far west exposed the French west flank. With news of his situation, and the fact that his flanks could give and be completely enwrapped, Lanrezac ordered a general retreat into northern France.

 Siege of Maubeuge
The French town of Maubeuge was a major fort on the French side of the border. With a junction of no fewer than five major railway lines, it was recognized as a key strategic position by both sides; hence the construction of 15 forts and gun batteries ringing it, a total of 435 guns, and a permanent garrison of 35,000 troops. These were further bolstered by the choosing of the town as the advance base of the British Expeditionary Force. However, when these and the French Fifth Army retreated following the events at Charleroi, the town was cut off from allied support, and subsequently besieged on August 25. The German heavy artillery succeeded in demolishing the key forts around the city, and General Joseph Anthelme Fournier, in command of the garrison in the city, surrendered to the Germans some 13 days later.

1914

 Battle of Le Cateau
 Battle of St. Quentin, also called the Battle of Guise
 First Battle of the Marne
 First Battle of the Aisne
 Siege of Antwerp
 First Battle of Albert
 First Battle of Arras
 Battle of the Yser
 First Battle of Ypres
 First Battle of Champagne

1915
 Battle of Neuve Chapelle
 Second Battle of Ypres
 Second Battle of Artois
 Battle of Loos
 Second Battle of Champagne

1916
 Battle of Verdun
 Battle of Hulluch
 Battle of the Somme
 Battle of Fromelles
 Battle of Pozières
 Battle of Ginchy

1917
 Nivelle Offensive
 Battle of Arras (1917)
 Battle of Vimy Ridge
 Second Battle of the Aisne, also called the Third Battle of Champagne
 Battle of Messines
 Third Battle of Ypres, also called the Battle of Passchendaele
 Battle of La Malmaison
 Battle of Cambrai (1917)

1918
 German spring offensive
 Second Battle of the Somme (1918), also known as the Battle of St. Quentin or the Second Battle of the Somme (to distinguish it from the 1916 battle)
 Battle of the Lys, also known as the Fourth Battle of Ypres and the Battle of Estaires
 Third Battle of the Aisne
 Battle of Cantigny
 Battle of Belleau Wood
 Second Battle of the Marne
 Battle of Soissons (1918)
 Battle of Château-Thierry (1918)
 Hundred Days Offensive
 Battle of Amiens
 Second Battle of the Somme (1918), also known as the Third Battle of the Somme
 Battle of Saint-Mihiel
 Battle of Epéhy
 Battle of the Hindenburg Line
 Meuse-Argonne Offensive, also called the Battle of the Argonne Forest
 Battle of Cambrai (1918)
 Battle of the Sambre (1918), also known as the Second Battle of the Sambre

Italian Campaign 
 First Battle of the Isonzo
 Second Battle of the Isonzo
 Third Battle of the Isonzo
 Fourth Battle of the Isonzo
 Fifth Battle of the Isonzo
 Trentino Offensive or the "Battle of Asiago"
 Sixth Battle of the Isonzo or the "Battle of Gorizia"
 Seventh Battle of the Isonzo
 Eighth Battle of the Isonzo
 Ninth Battle of the Isonzo
 Tenth Battle of the Isonzo
 Eleventh Battle of the Isonzo
 Twelfth Battle of the Isonzo or the "Battle of Caporetto"
 Battle of the Piave River
 Battle of Vittorio Veneto

Eastern Front 
1914
 Battle of Stallupönen
 Battle of Gumbinnen
 Battle of Tannenberg
 Battle of Galicia
 First Battle of the Masurian Lakes
 Battle of the Vistula River
 Battle of Łódź (1914)
 Battle of Limanowa
1915
 Siege of Przemysl
 Battle of Bolimov
 Second Battle of the Masurian Lakes
 Great Retreat (Russian)  
 Sventiany Offensive
1916
 Lake Naroch Offensive
 Brusilov Offensive
Battle of Lutsk
Battle of Kostiuchnówka
Battle of Kowel

1917
 Kerensky Offensive
 Russian Revolution
1918
 Operation Faustschlag

Romanian Campaign 
1916
 Battle of Transylvania (Central Powers Victory)
 Battle of Turtucaia (Central Powers Victory)
 Battle of Dobrich (Bulgarian Victory)
 First Battle of Cobadin (Romanian-Russian Victory)
  (Central Powers Victory)
  (Romanian Victory)
 Battle of Turnu Roșu Pass (Romanian victory)
 Flămânda Offensive (Central Powers Victory)
 Battle of Brassó (1916) (Central Powers Victory)
  (Romanian Victory)
  (Romanian Victory)
 First Battle of Oituz (Romanian Victory)
 Second Battle of Cobadin (Central Powers Victory)
 First Battle of the Jiu Valley (Romanian Victory)
 Second Battle of the Jiu Valley (Central Powers Victory)
 Battle of Vulcan Pass (Central Powers Victory)
 Second Battle of Oituz (Romanian Victory)
  (Central Powers Victory)
 Battle of Robănești (German Victory)
 Battle of Bucharest (Central Powers Victory)
 Prunaru Charge (Central Powers Victory)
 Battle of the Argeș (Central Powers Victory)
 Battle of Râmnicu Sărat (Central Powers Victory)

1917
 Battle of Tulcea (Romanian Victory)
 Battle of Mărăști (Romanian-Russian Victory)
 Battle of Mărășești (Romanian-Russian Victory)
 Third Battle of Oituz (Romanian-Russian Victory)

Caucasus Campaign 
 Battle of Sarikamish (December 1914 - January 1915)
Battle of Ardahan
Defense of Van (1915)
 Battle of Manzikert (1915)
 Battle of Kara Killisse
Erzurum Offensive
Battle of Koprukoy
Battle of Erzincan
 Battle of Baku

Serbian Campaign 
 Battle of Cer
Srem Offensive
 Battle of Drina
 Battle of Kolubara
 Battle of Morava
 Battle of Kosovo (1915)
 Battle of Ovche Pole

Gallipoli Campaign 

The Gallipoli Campaign (also called the "Dardanelles Campaign"), was a number of battles fought between 1915 and 1916.

 Battle of the Nek
 Battle of Chunuk Bair
 Battle of Gully Ravine
 Battle of Hill 60 (Gallipoli)
 Battle of Krithia Vineyard
 Battle of Lone Pine
 Battle of Sari Bair
 Battle of Scimitar Hill
 Landing at Anzac Cove
 Landing at Cape Helles
 First Battle of Krithia
 Second Battle of Krithia
 Third Battle of Krithia
 Naval operations in the Dardanelles Campaign

Macedonian front 
 Battle of Krivolak
Battle of Kosturino
 1st Battle of Doiran
 Battle of Florina
 Battle of Struma
 Monastir Offensive 
 Battle of Malka Nidzhe
 Battle of Kajmakchalan
 1st Battle of Cerna Bend
2nd Battle of Monastir
2nd Battle of Doiran
 2nd Battle of Cerna Bend
 Battle of Skra-di-Legen
 Vardar Offensive 
 Battle of Dobro Pole
 3rd Battle of Doiran

Sinai and Palestine Campaign 
 First Suez Offensive
 Battle of Romani or "The Second Suez Offensive"
Battle of Bir el Abd
 Battle of Magdhaba
 Battle of Rafa
 Battle of Mughar Ridge
 Battle of Jerusalem
 Fall of Damascus
 First Battle of Gaza
 Second Battle of Gaza
 Third Battle of Gaza or the "Battle of Beersheba"
 Battle of Beersheba
 Battle of Megiddo

Mesopotamian Campaign 
 Fao Landing
 Fall of Basra
 Battle of Qurna
Capture of Amara
Battle of Nasiriyah
 Battle of Es Sinn
 Battle of Ctesiphon
 Siege of Kut
 Battle of Sheikh Sa'ad
 Battle of the Wadi
 Battle of Hanna
 Battle of Dujaila Redoubt
 First Battle of Kut
 Battle of Khanaqin
 Second Battle of Kut
 Fall of Baghdad
 Samarra offensive
 Battle of Jebel Hamlin
 Battle of Istabulat
 Battle of Ramadi
 Capture of Tikrit
 Battle of Sharqat

African theatre of World War I 
 Fall of Cameroon
 Fall of German South-West Africa (Namibia)
 Fall of Togo
 Fall of German East Africa
 Senussi Campaign
 Battle of Tanga or Battle of the Bees
 Battle of Rufiji Delta
 Battle of Kilimanjaro
 Battle of Sandfontein
 Battle of Segale
 Battle of Agagia
 Battle of Chra

Asia-Pacific Theatre 
 Siege of Tsingtao
 Occupation of German Samoa
 Battle of Bita Paka
 Siege of Toma
 Central Asian revolt of 1916

Naval engagements

Atlantic Theatre 
 First Battle of Heligoland Bight (1914)
 Battle of Coronel (1914)
 Battle of the Falkland Islands (1914)
 Raid on Scarborough, Hartlepool and Whitby (1914)
 Battle of Dogger Bank (1915)
 Otranto Barrage (1915–1918)
 Battle of Jutland (1916)
 Battle of Dover Strait (1917)
 Second Battle of Heligoland Bight (1917)
 Zeebrugge Raid (1918)

Mediterranean
 Pursuit of Goeben and Breslau (1914)
 Naval operations in the Dardanelles Campaign (1915–1916)
 Battle of the Otranto Straits (1917)

Asia-Pacific Theatre 
 Battle of Rabaul
 Battle of Tsingtao (1914)
 Battle of Penang (1914)
 Battle of Coronel (1914)
 Battle of Cocos (1914)

Air engagements
World War I was the first war to see major use of planes for offensive, defensive and reconnaissance operations, and both the Entente Powers and the Central Powers used planes extensively. Almost as soon as they were invented, planes were drafted for military service.

See also the following articles:
 Aviation in World War I
 Aviation history (1914-1918)
 Flying aces
 List of World War I flying aces
 Strategic bombing during World War I
 Zeppelins in World War I

Co-belligerent conflicts
These conflicts are considered part of the First World War because one or more of the combatants were aligned with a main belligerent power which may have provided materiel, military, financial, or political support.

Pre-First World War 
 Mexican Revolution (1910–1920)
 Italo-Turkish War (1911-1912)
 First Balkan War (1912–13)
 Second Balkan War (1913)
 Muscat rebellion (1913-20)
 Zaian War (1914-21)
 Kurdish rebellions during World War I (1914-17)

During the First World War 
 Maritz Rebellion (1914–15)
 Easter Rising (1916)
 Warlord Era (1916–1928)
 Senussi Campaign (1915–17)
Arab Revolt (1916-1918)
Russian Revolution (1917)
 Finnish Civil War (1918)
 Russian Civil War (1918–22)
 North Russia Campaign (1918–19)
 Russian westward offensive (1918–19)

Post-First World War 
 Greater Poland Uprising (1918–19)
 Hungarian-Romanian War (1918–19)
 Polish-Soviet War (1919–21)
 Irish War of Independence (1919–21)
 Turkish War of Independence (1919–23)
 Greco-Turkish War (1919–22)
 Vlora War (1920)
 Irish Civil War (1922–23)

References

Sources

Battles of World War I
military engagements